Paige Kathleen Nielsen (born October 14, 1993) is an American soccer defender who currently plays for  Angel City FC in the National Women's Soccer League.

Early life
Born in Lincoln, Nebraska to Kathy Nielsen, Paige attended Lincoln Southeast High School where she was a four-year varsity soccer player. She was twice named a Nebraska Gatorade Player of the Year nominee in 2011 and 2012. She set new school records after ending her high school career with 79 goals and 35 assists. She was twice-named to All-State, All-Conference and All-City soccer teams.

Nielsen played club soccer for Toro Bravo soccer in Omaha, Nebraska and helped lead the team to three state championships, the Midwest Regional League championship in 2011, and National League Red Division championship in 2012. She played for the Nebraska Olympic Development (ODP) team from 2007 to 2010.

College career

University of North Carolina
Nielsen attended the University of North Carolina, Chapel Hill from 2012 to 2015 where she played for the Tar Heels. During her freshman season, Nielsen played in 20 games for the Tar Heels, starting five. That same year, the team won the NCAA Division I Women's Soccer Championship for the 21st time. The following year, Nielsen ranked fourth on the team in goals scored.  She finished her sophomore season with six goals and four assists. During her junior season in 2014, she played in 20 games, starting nine. Four of the five goals she scored were game-winning goals, which ranked first on the team in game-winning goals. Nielsen captained the Tar Heels during her senior season and finished her collegiate career with 13 goals and 7 assists playing as both a defender and forward.

Club career

Seattle Reign FC, 2016
In January 2016, Nielsen was selected as the 25th overall pick of the 2016 NWSL College Draft by the Seattle Reign, becoming the first Nebraskan native to be drafted by an NWSL team. She signed with the club in May of the same year. She made her debut for the club in a match against the Chicago Red Stars on May 22. The following week, she played the full ninety minutes in the forward position in a friendly against recent FA WSL champion Arsenal L.F.C. Nielsen was waived by the Reign in July 2016.

Western Sydney Wanderers, 2016–2017
After short stint with Apollon in Cyprus, Nielsen signed with the Western Sydney Wanderers for the 2016-17 W-League season where she started all twelve games for the Wanderers.

Suwon UDC, 2017–2018
After the conclusion of the W-League season, Nielsen signed with Suwon UDC in the WK League in South Korea.

Canberra United, 2018
In November 2018, Nielsen signed with Canberra United in the W-League. She departed the club in December after making five appearances for the team.

Washington Spirit, 2019–2021
In February 2019, Nielsen returned to the NWSL signing with the Washington Spirit.

Angel City FC, 2021– 
On 16 December 2021 Nielsen was selected by Angel City in the 2022 NWSL expansion draft.

See also
 List of University of North Carolina at Chapel Hill alumni

References

External links
 North Carolina player profile
 

Living people
1993 births
American women's soccer players
OL Reign players
Washington Spirit players
Western Sydney Wanderers FC (A-League Women) players
Canberra United FC players
National Women's Soccer League players
A-League Women players
Women's association football defenders
Women's association football forwards
Sportspeople from Lincoln, Nebraska
Soccer players from Nebraska
North Carolina Tar Heels women's soccer players
Apollon Ladies F.C. players
OL Reign draft picks
Suwon FC Women players
American expatriate women's soccer players
American expatriate sportspeople in Cyprus
Expatriate women's footballers in Cyprus
American expatriate sportspeople in Australia
Expatriate women's soccer players in Australia
American expatriate sportspeople in South Korea
Expatriate women's footballers in South Korea